The Nepalese cricket team toured the Netherlands in August 2018 to play two One Day Internationals (ODIs) matches against the Dutch cricket team. They were the first ODI matches to be played by Nepal since they were awarded ODI status by the International Cricket Council (ICC) during the 2018 Cricket World Cup Qualifier. It was the first ODI series to be played in the Netherlands since 2013, when South Africa played a one-off match, and the first ODI matches to be played by the Netherlands since the 2014 Cricket World Cup Qualifier tournament.

In July 2018, the Koninklijke Nederlandse Cricket Bond (KNCB) confirmed the venues for the two matches. Later in the same month, Nepal's Shakti Gauchan announced that he would retire from international cricket after the conclusion of the series. He played in the first match of the series before retiring.

The Netherlands won the first ODI by 55 runs, with Michael Rippon named the man of the match. Along with Nepal's starting eleven all making their ODI debuts in the match, five players in the Netherlands' squad also made their debuts in the format. Nepal won the second match by one run, to record their first win in ODIs, and therefore drawing the series 1–1. Following the win, Nepal's captain Paras Khadka said it felt great and that it "shows a lot of character within the team".

Squads

ODI Series

1st ODI

2nd ODI

References

External links
 Series home at ESPN Cricinfo

2018 in Dutch cricket
2018 in Nepalese cricket
International cricket competitions in 2018
International cricket tours of the Netherlands
Nepalese cricket tours abroad